Gay Gaddis is an American entrepreneur, speaker, author, and artist. In 1989, she founded T3, an advertising agency that grew into one of the largest female-owned agencies in the U.S., under her leadership for 30+ years with offices in New York, Atlanta, San Francisco and a headquarter in Austin, TX. T3 was a Certified Woman-Owned Business from 1999 - 2019, and through the T3 and Under program, Gaddis has been a pioneer in allowing parents to bring their newborn children into the office as a means by which to improve their transition to daycare. She currently serves as CEO of Gay Gaddis, LLC, empowering the next generation of business leaders through a women's development program she founded at the McCombs School of Business at University of Texas entitled Women Who Mean Business. She is an active speaker on women’s leadership, company culture and entrepreneurship. Her book, Cowgirl Power: How to Kick Ass in Business and Life, was released in January 2018, sharing insights and examples how to develop personal power and lead like a fearless cowgirl. 

She has won numerous awards including being the 11th female and only fine arts graduate inducted into the McCombs School of Business Hall of Fame  at the University of Texas, Fast Company's “Top 25 Women Business Builders,” Inc. Magazine's “Top 10 Entrepreneurs of the Year” and C200’s Luminary Award for Entrepreneurial Excellence. She is a regular contributor to Forbes and Fortune.

Gay was the first female chairman of the Texas Business Leadership Council and is former chairman of The Committee of 200 (C200), a top women’s business organization that advances women’s leadership in business, and is on the board of directors of the Texas Cultural Trust. She was also an immediate past board member for Monotype Imaging Holdings, Inc, serves on the Dean’s Advisory Council to The University of Texas McCombs School of Business, and is an advisor for both the College of Fine Arts and the Moody College of Communication..

Gaddis is a mother of three. Her and her husband, Lee live and own the historic Double Heart Ranch in the Texas Hill Country, home of Gay’s private art studio and gallery. As an artist, Gaddis' bold and vibrant paintings have been shown in several prestigious galleries around the country including the gallery at Fossil Ridge and New York City, earning her a distinction by Texas Monthly magazine as one of the “Top Ten Artists to Collect Now.”

References

American women business executives
Marketing women
Living people
Place of birth missing (living people)
Year of birth missing (living people)
21st-century American women
Businesspeople from Houston